Contemporary Services Corporation, (CSC) is a crowd management and security company. They operate at concerts, professional sporting events, collegiate athletic events, and conventions.

History
CSC was founded in Los Angeles in 1967. As of 2015, they operate more than 50 branch locations serving over 200 cities within the United States and Canada.  CSC has over 40,000 employees including full time and part time employees.  In September 2019, CSC became an employee owned company (ESOP) with the same management team still in place.  

CSC's services have been “Designated” as Qualified Anti-Terrorism Technology (QATT) by the United States Department of Homeland Security under the Support Anti-terrorism by Fostering Effective Technologies Act (SAFETY Act) of 2002.

Current operations
CSC is the largest event staff, and one of the largest security companies in North America. They are present in almost every major city in the US and Canada and are easily recognizable by their yellow and black shirts. CSC has also provided extra security for numerous presidential inaugurations since 1980. CSC provides services for major convention shows across the US and Canada and are well known at most convention centers.

They are the main line of security for several NFL teams, such as the Los Angeles Rams.

CSC also provides security for the Washington Nationals, Miami Marlins, Cleveland Indians, and Los Angeles Angels of Anaheim MLB teams.

They provide services at the Coachella Music Festival in Indio, California and at the Firefly Festival in Dover, Delaware.

References

External links
 

Security companies of the United States
Business services companies established in 1967